Friedrich Christian Meuschen (15 September 1719 – 20 February 1811) was a German diplomat and conchologist born in Hanau. He was the son of theologian Johann Gerhard Meuschen (1680–1743).

Meuschen was a diplomatic representative in The Hague, where he served as a liaison secretary. He was also a merchant of shells and other objects of natural history. From 1766 to 1778 he catalogued numerous natural history collections, and published his findings in an 8-volume work titled Miscellanea Conchyliologica.  He died in Berlin.

The fish genus Meuschenia is named in his honor by Australian ichthyologist Gilbert Percy Whitley (1903–1975).

References 
 The Mineralogical Record - Library Essay on "Miscellanea Conchyliologica"
 40th California International Antiquarian Book Fair (book selections)
 Holthuis (1998) Archives of Natural History. Volume 25, Page 75-85 DOI 10.3366/anh.1998.25.1.75, ISSN 0260-9541, Available Online February 1998.

1719 births
1811 deaths
Conchologists
People from Hanau
Fellows of the Royal Society